Casale Litta is a comune (municipality) in the Province of Varese in the Italian region Lombardy, located about  northwest of Milan and about  southwest of Varese.

Casale Litta borders the following municipalities: Bodio Lomnago, Crosio della Valle, Daverio, Inarzo, Mornago, Varano Borghi, Vergiate.

Demographic evolution

References

Cities and towns in Lombardy